Gerygone, the gerygones or peep-warblers, is a genus of bird in the family Acanthizidae.  The genus ranges from Southeast Asia through New Guinea and Australia to New Zealand and the Chatham Islands. Most of the species are found in Australia and New Guinea; only one, the golden-bellied gerygone, has managed to cross Wallace's Line and colonise as far as Thailand, Malaysia and the Philippines.

Gerygones are insectivores which obtain most of their food by gleaning and snatching in the foliage of trees and bushes. They are small, mostly weighing an average of 6–7 g, and show little variation in size across their range, except for the insular Chatham gerygone, which is nearly twice as large as the rest of the genus.

Their songs are described as "simple but delightful", many descending in pitch, and some species are excellent mimics.  "Gerygone" means "born of sound" (Magrath 2003).

The genus contains 20 species including one which is now extinct:
 Brown gerygone, Gerygone mouki
 Grey gerygone, Gerygone igata
 Norfolk gerygone, Gerygone modesta
† Lord Howe gerygone, Gerygone insularis – extinct (c.1930)
 Chatham gerygone, Gerygone albofrontata
 Fan-tailed gerygone, Gerygone flavolateralis
 Rennell gerygone, Gerygone citrina – split from G. flavolateralis
 Brown-breasted gerygone, Gerygone ruficollis
 Golden-bellied gerygone, Gerygone sulphurea
 Rufous-sided gerygone, Gerygone dorsalis
 Mangrove gerygone, Gerygone levigaster
 Plain gerygone, Gerygone inornata
 Western gerygone, Gerygone fusca
 Dusky gerygone, Gerygone tenebrosa
 Large-billed gerygone, Gerygone magnirostris
 Biak gerygone, Gerygone hypoxantha – previous a subspecies of G. magnirostris
 Yellow-bellied gerygone, Gerygone chrysogaster
 Green-backed gerygone, Gerygone chloronota
 White-throated gerygone, Gerygone olivacea
 Fairy gerygone, Gerygone palpebrosa

References

 Del Hoyo, J.; Elliot, A. & Christie D. (editors). (2006). Handbook of the Birds of the World. Volume 12: Picathartes to Tits and Chickadees. Lynx Edicions. 
Keast, A. & Recher, H. (1997) "The adaptive zone of the genus Gerygone (Acanthizidae) as shown by morphology and feeding habits." Emu 97(1): 1-17

External links

 
Bird genera
Taxonomy articles created by Polbot